Alberta has provincial legislation allowing its municipalities to conduct municipal censuses between April 1 and June 30 inclusive. Municipalities choose to conduct their own censuses for multiple reasons such as to better inform municipal service planning and provision, to capitalize on per capita based grant funding from higher levels of government, or to simply update their populations since the last federal census.

Alberta had 358 municipalities between April 1 and June 30, 2013, down from 359 during the same three-month period in 2012. At least 40 of these municipalities conducted a municipal census in 2013. Alberta Municipal Affairs recognized those conducted by 38 of these municipalities. By municipal status, it recognized those conducted by 8 of Alberta's 17 cities, 16 of 108 towns, 5 of 94 villages, 1 of 51 summer villages and 8 of 64 municipal districts. In addition to those recognized by Municipal Affairs, censuses were conducted by the Town of Swan Hills and the Municipal District of Greenview No. 16.

Some municipalities achieved population milestones as a result of their 2013 censuses. The cities of Lethbridge and Lloydminster surpassed the 90,000 and the 30,000 marks respectively. Furthermore, the Alberta and Saskatchewan portions of Lloydminster exceeded the 20,000 and 10,000 milestones respectively as well. Okotoks, Alberta's largest town, surpassed 25,000 residents, while the Town of Whitecourt became eligible for city status by eclipsing 10,000 people. The Town of Blackfalds and the Municipal District of Taber each surpassed the 7,000-mark and the Town of Wainwright grew beyond 6,000.

Municipal census results 
The following summarizes the results of the numerous municipal censuses conducted in 2013.

Breakdowns

Lloydminster 
The following is a breakdown of the results of the City of Lloydminster's 2013 municipal census by provincial component.

Hamlets 

The following is a list of hamlet populations determined by 2013 municipal censuses conducted by three municipalities.

Shadow population counts 
Alberta Municipal Affairs defines shadow population as "temporary residents of a municipality who are employed by an industrial or commercial establishment in the municipality for a minimum of 30 days within a municipal census year." Numerous municipalities conducted shadow population counts at the same time as their municipal censuses in 2013. The following presents the results of those municipalities that conducted shadow population counts and compares them with their municipal census results.

Notes

See also 
2013 Alberta municipal elections
List of communities in Alberta
List of municipalities in Alberta

References

External links 
Alberta Municipal Affairs: Municipal Census & Population Lists
Statistics Canada: Census Profile (2011 Census)

Local government in Alberta
Municipal censuses in Alberta
2013 censuses
Municipal censuses, 2013